The ninth series of the British science fiction television programme Doctor Who premiered on 19 September 2015 with "The Magician's Apprentice" and concluded on 5 December 2015 with "Hell Bent". The series was led by head writer and executive producer Steven Moffat, alongside executive producer Brian Minchin. Nikki Wilson, Peter Bennett, and Derek Ritchie served as producers. The series is the ninth to air following the programme's revival in 2005, and is the thirty-fifth season overall.

This is the second series starring Peter Capaldi as the Twelfth Doctor, an alien Time Lord who travels through time and space in his TARDIS, which is disguised as a British police box. It also stars Jenna Coleman as the Doctor's companion, Clara Oswald, for her third and final series in the role. Also playing a major recurring role in the series is Maisie Williams as Ashildr, a Viking girl made immortal by the Doctor, which leads to major events resulting from her encounters with the Doctor. The series' main story arc revolves around the mystery of a being called the Hybrid, the combination of two great warrior races. The Doctor's investigation into this being ultimately leads him back to his home planet of Gallifrey, which returns fully in the series.

Steven Moffat wrote four episodes solo and co-wrote an additional two. The other writers who worked on this series included Toby Whithouse, Jamie Mathieson, Catherine Tregenna, Peter Harness, Mark Gatiss, and Sarah Dollard. The ninth series received acclaim from critics, with many labelling it as the show's strongest season to date. Aspects of the series that were met with the most praise included the writing, directing, and structure of the series, as well as the performances of Peter Capaldi, Jenna Coleman and Maisie Williams.

Episodes

The series contains more than one two-part story for the first time since the sixth series in 2011. Episodes such as "The Girl Who Died" / "The Woman Who Lived" and "Face the Raven" / "Heaven Sent" / "Hell Bent" are connected through loose story arcs, but are considered separate when it comes to their respective story numbers.

Prequels
The following were both prequels to "The Magician's Apprentice".

Casting

The ninth series was the second starring Peter Capaldi as the Twelfth Doctor, and the third and final starring Jenna Coleman as the Doctor's companion Clara Oswald. In Doctor Who Magazine, Michelle Gomez confirmed that she would return as Missy, the latest incarnation of the Master, who served as the main villain in series 8. In February 2015, it was confirmed that Missy would return in "The Magician's Apprentice" / "The Witch's Familiar", the opening episodes of the series.

In January 2015, it was announced that actor Paul Kaye had a guest role in the first production block. It was later announced that other guest actors featuring in the first block would include Arsher Ali, Morven Christie, Neil Fingleton, Colin McFarlane, and Steven Robertson.

Jemma Redgrave returned in the recurring role of Kate Lethbridge-Stewart. Kelly Hunter was also confirmed to be appearing in the opening story, alongside Jaye Griffiths and Clare Higgins. Hunter previously appeared as the Shadow Architect for the Shadow Proclamation in "The Stolen Earth", while Higgins appeared in "The Night of the Doctor" as Ohila, High Priestess of the Sisterhood of Karn. It was announced on 8 May 2015 that Ingrid Oliver would return as Osgood alongside Redgrave for "The Zygon Invasion" / "The Zygon Inversion", a story involving the Zygons, despite her apparent death in the previous series.

On 5 August 2015, it was announced that Reece Shearsmith, Elaine Tan, Neet Mohan, Bethany Black and Paul Courtenay Hyu would have a role in "Sleep No More".

Other guests included India Ria Amarteifio, Dasharn Anderson, Harki Bhambra, Daniel Hoffmann-Gill, Aaron Neil, Demi Papaminas, Joey Price and Jami Reid-Quarrell. On 30 March 2015, Maisie Williams, Rufus Hound, Tom Stourton, Ariyon Bakare, Simon Lipkin, Ian Conningham, Murray McArthur, Barnaby Kay, John Voce, and Struan Rodger were announced to be appearing. On 19 April 2015, David Schofield was announced to be playing Viking god Odin. On 4 June 2015, it was announced that Rebecca Front, who starred alongside Capaldi in The Thick of It, would appear in "The Zygon Invasion". On 10 June 2015, it was announced that Joivan Wade would return as Rigsy, who previously appeared in "Flatline". Robin Soans played Chronolock Guy in "Face the Raven"; Soans previously appeared in Doctor Who as Luvic in The Keeper of Traken.

Julian Bleach reprised his role as Davros, having last appeared in the role in 2008's "The Stolen Earth" / "Journey's End", while Joey Price debuted as a younger version of the character. On September 28, 2015 it was announced that Corey Taylor, frontman for the heavy metal band Slipknot, would feature in the fourth episode "Before the Flood", as the scream of the alien warlord Fisher King.

Production

Development
Before series 8 began, Moffat promised a cliffhanger for series 9, and teased in Doctor Who Magazine Issue 475, "I've figured out the cliffhanger to the penultimate episode of series 9. And it's a whopper. Ohh, I don’t think you'll see this coming!" The series saw the return of the cliffhanger, with six of the twelve episodes divided into two-parters. Moffat has stated that the two-part stories are not as connected as similar stories in previous series, but instead are quite different and only vaguely related. In April 2015, Steven Moffat confirmed that Doctor Who would run for at least another five years, extending the show until at least 2020.

As the series coincides with the 10th anniversary of the show's revival, the BBC asked former showrunner and head writer Russell T. Davies to return, but he declined. A BBC source said that plans for the revival anniversary were still to be decided, despite Davies' reluctance to return. He also believed that the success of the revived show meant that "It’s now impossible for it to ever be axed." However, despite the comments made to Radio Times, in an interview with BBC Radio 2 a week later, Davies said he would love to write more Doctor Who, specifically a movie.

Writing
Steven Moffat wrote the opening two-parter story, and Catherine Tregenna wrote an episode for the series. Tregenna had previously been involved in Doctor Who spin-off series Torchwood. 

In January 2015, the Doctor Who Twitter page reported that filming had begun on episodes written by Toby Whithouse, who had previously contributed episodes "School Reunion", "The Vampires of Venice", "The God Complex" and "A Town Called Mercy". On 16 March 2015, Mark Gatiss confirmed he would be writing an episode for the series. On 30 March 2015, it was confirmed Jamie Mathieson, who previously wrote "Mummy on the Orient Express" and "Flatline" for series 8, would write a new episode called "The Girl Who Died" with Moffat. On 8 May 2015 it was announced that Peter Harness, who wrote series 8's "Kill the Moon", would write a two-part story. Justin Molotnikov was to direct two 60 minute episodes for Doctor Who, according to his CV, though this was removed at a later date. However, he directed the ninth and tenth episodes of the series.

Music
Murray Gold composed the soundtrack to this series, with orchestration by Ben Foster.

Filming
Filming and principal photography for the ninth series began on 5 January 2015 in Cardiff, with "Under the Lake" and "Before the Flood" making up the first production block. The read-through for the first block took place on 18 December 2014. The second production block consisted of two of Steven Moffat's episodes, the opening two-parter. Filming for the story took place in Tenerife, Spain, in February 2015, directed by Hettie MacDonald, who directed the 2007 episode "Blink".

On 30 March 2015, it was announced that Ed Bazalgette would direct two episodes, one written by Jamie Mathieson and Steven Moffat and the other by Catherine Tregenna. On 8 May 2015, the BBC announced that filming had started on a two-part episode written by Peter Harness and directed by Daniel Nettheim. On 10 June 2015, it was revealed by the BBC that filming for Block 5 had begun with Justin Molotnikov directing "Face the Raven", written by Sarah Dollard. On 1 July 2015, the BBC confirmed that Rachel Talalay would return to direct the final two episodes of the series, both written by Steven Moffat.

Production blocks were arranged as follows:

Release

Promotion
On 9 July 2015, the first trailer for the series was released, alongside the confirmation of the airdate of "The Magician's Apprentice". The same day, Capaldi, Coleman, Gomez and Moffat promoted the series at San Diego Comic-Con International. On 12 August 2015, the second trailer for the series was released. A prologue to the series was released online on 11 September 2015. A prequel to the series, entitled "The Doctor's Meditation", was released on 15 September 2015 exclusively shown as part of a 3D cinematic release of the previous series' finale.

Broadcast
At the final 50th anniversary event at the BFI in December 2013, Steven Moffat announced that all future series, including the ninth, would not be split into two parts as had been done since the sixth series. Instead, they would be transmitted continuously, and that this would remain the standard broadcast format.

When filming began in January 2015, the BBC announced that the series would air late in the same year. A cinema screening of "The Magician's Apprentice" was held on 27 August 2015 in Edinburgh as part of The Guardian Edinburgh International Television Festival. It was also screened along with "The Witch's Familiar" on 10 September 2015 in Cardiff by BAFTA Cymru with a Q&A session following.

The twelve-episode ninth series premiered on BBC One on 19 September 2015. The series also premiered on 19 September in the United States on BBC America, and in Canada on Space. A screening for "The Magician's Apprentice" was held in the United States on 17 September at SVA Theatre in New York City. The premiere in Canada was preceded by a marathon of Doctor Who episodes featuring the Master.

New Zealand and Australia premiered the series on 20 September on Prime and ABC TV respectively. Episodes were released in Australia on the ABC iview streaming service initially, as opposed to the eighth series, which was simulcast on ABC TV with broadcasts featuring on ABC1 later the same night.

Home media

In print

Reception

Ratings

Critical reception
Doctor Whos ninth series received positive reviews, and was hailed by some critics as one of the show's best seasons to date. Series 9 holds a 90% approval rating on online review aggregate site Rotten Tomatoes with an average score of 8.25/10.  The site's consensus reads "Peter Capaldi and the writers have settled into an emotionally engaging tone, allowing the show to raise the stakes for the Twelfth Doctor". Reaction to individual episodes has also been highly positive, with scores on the site ranging from 61% to 95%, all certified fresh by the site. Episodes such as "The Woman Who Lived" and "Heaven Sent" received particular acclaim, with critics saying that the former "should be an episode that goes down in Doctor Who history" and "stands as perhaps the strongest entry of Season Thirty-Five thus far", whilst the latter was labelled "a masterpiece of the highest order" and "an instant classic". The lowest-scored episode for the season was the episode written by Mark Gatiss, "Sleep No More", which gained a 61% rating.

In reviews for various episodes across the series, some critics highlighted series 9 as the show's greatest yet. In their review for "Hell Bent", IGN called series 9 "a very strong season of Doctor Who – possibly the best season of the modern run of the show", while New York Magazine stated "It’s been a largely brilliant season... possibly even the best since the new series began" in their review for the same episode. Discussing the series as a whole, The A.V. Club stated "Doctor Who is great again, and this season represents maybe the best mixture yet of the show’s head and its heart". Of the twelve episodes in the season, they awarded five a perfect 'A' grade (the most for any season of the show), while awarding a further five episodes either an A− or a B+. Furthermore, TVEquals.com called series 9 "one of the strongest seasons of the show in years".

Awards and nominations

Soundtrack
Selected pieces of score from this series, as composed by Murray Gold, were released in a 4-CD set on 27 April 2018 by Silva Screen Records along with music from the 2015 Christmas special "The Husbands of River Song", with the third disc consisting primarily of the score from "Heaven Sent".

Notes

References

Series 09
 
Series 09
2015 British television seasons